Swindon Museum and Art Gallery is a mothballed museum in Swindon, Wiltshire, England, which is currently closed while a new venue is sought.

Collections 
The Swindon Art Gallery collection was established in 1944 by a local benefactor, H. J. P. Bomford, through a significant donation of artworks. Swindon Museum and Art Gallery's collection focuses on major artists and movements of 20th and 21st century British art, with several works presented by the Art Fund and the Contemporary Art Society. Artists in the collection include Simon Carter, Amanda Ansell, Ben Nicholson, Henry Moore, Lucian Freud, Graham Sutherland, L S Lowry, Paul Nash, Steven Pippin, Terry Frost, Roger Hilton, Howard Hodgkin, John Hoyland, Richard Hamilton, Gwen John, Augustus John, Maggi Hambling, John Bellany, Tony Bevan, Ivon Hitchens, John Piper, Christopher le Brun, Dennis Creffield, Lisa Milroy, Julie Umerle, David Leach, Lucie Rie, Hans Coper, Gillian Ayres, Linda Ingham, Robert Priseman, Sheila Fell, Eileen Cooper, Grayson Perry and William Turnbull.  The media include paintings, photography and studio pottery.

The museum had on display local archaeology, geology, and history. Displays presented Swindon's geological Jurassic history, its association with the Roman Empire, and the town's social history.

Swindon Museum and Art Gallery was one of the venues for the annual Swindon Festival of Literature.

Status 
The museum was obliged to close in March 2020 in response to the COVID-19 pandemic, and has not yet reopened.

Until June 2021 it was housed in Apsley House, a 19th-century former house on the corner of Bath Road and Victoria Road in Swindon's Old Town, but had to leave when Swindon Borough Council decided the building was no longer suitable and required major repairs. The collection is intact and largely in storage, and the council have stated their commitment to the long term future of the institution.

References

Further reading 

 Thamesdown Borough Council, 1991, The Swindon Collection of twentieth century British art, ISBN 1871853028 
 Cummings, Sophie, 2016, A guide to the Swindon Collection of modern British art (with a foreword by Robert Hiscox), Swindon Borough Council
 Cummings, Sophie, 2016, From Where I'm Standing, Contemporary Ceramics and the Swindon Collection, Swindon Borough Council. Catalogue of an exhibition supported by Arts Council England where contemporary ceramic artists responded to works from the permanent collection.

External links

 

1944 establishments in England
Art galleries established in 1944
Art museums established in 1944
Buildings and structures in Swindon
Local museums in Wiltshire
Art museums and galleries in Wiltshire
Modern art museums in the United Kingdom